The Karppillikkavu Sree Mahadeva Temple is a Siva temple in India. The specialty of this temple is that the deity have been done giving dharshan to western side. This temple is situated in Manjapra village in Ernakulam District of Kerala. The deity of the Siva is in the Sankalppa of Kirathamoorthy that is Vettakkaran. It is also the legend is that Prathishta has been done by Kartavirya Arjuna.

The legend also goes in this line that this temple first was having the prathishta of Sri Devi (Parvathy) but when Karthyaveerarjuna came to temple to do dharshan of Sri Devi's (Parvathy) sannidhaya was not there and so he conducted Prathishta of Siva in the temple and he staid in the cave constructed by him in the northern side of temple and he spend much of time doing siva dhyanam.

In an Ashtamangalaprasna conducted by Daivanjan Kaimukku Parameswaran Nambudiripad, he came to the conclusion that there is a connecting invisible very huge tunnel in between the well and the pond of the temple and this tunnel extends from the pond about 30 k.m east of the pond and at the end of the tunnel there situated very old temple and a pond having trees, plant of high medicinal value.

Auspicious days

All the pradhosha are very important days to the temple Thiruvathira day in Dhanu, Sivarahtri, Vidhyarambam, Mandala days and Thiruvathira Nakshthram in Makaram month is the Aarattu day after an 8-day festival. The festival days are very important days in which Siva remains very joyful and to do dharshan at that time and kanickka offering before his lotus feet is very good for Abhishtasidhi and Aiswaryasidhi. Further more the Vishu day, Uthram Nakshathram in Medom month which is the Prathishta day of the temple. Niraputhari and Ramayana masacharanam are the other important occasions and days. The Festival of the Temple conducted in a very grand style with the co-operation and assistance of Hindus, Christians and Muslims. The focus of this festival is that all persons whether belonging to Hindu religion or other considers it as a local festival of all concerned. The festival prolongs to 8 days and religious celebrations are carried out in the strict thanthric ways but for enjoyment and assembly of all concerns cultural and other programmes which fits with the Achara of the temple is also conducted in the temple. On the 7th day of festival idol is brought out from the temple and accompanied by seven eminent elephants of Kerala and well known artist for Panchavadhyam and Chendamelom procession is conducted through the Manjapra town and later possession ends at the temple and idol will be take in. On 6th day of the Utsavabali festival is conducted in the temple in a majestic manner accompanied by Vadhyamelom, Marappani, Nadaswaram and other temple instrumental Equipments. Sreeboothabali has got very much importance just because it is the pooja feast provided for Bhoothagana that is soldiers of Siva along with the feast to Bhoothagana Annadhanam is also provided to all the local assembly.
At time of Utsavabali there will be Kanickka samarppanam that is offering devotees in large to the lord to meet expenses of Utsavabali, Utsav as well as celebrations.

Karppillikkavu Pooram

is celebrated in association with the annual festival of Karppillikkavu Shri Mahadeva Temple. The temple is one among the 108 eminent Shiva kshetras in India, located at Manjapra village in Ernakulam District. The presiding deity is Lord Shiva. The festival is held during the Malayalam month of Makaram (January–February) for 8 days.
It is believed that these festival days are very important days in which Shiva is in a pleasant mood and grants all that the devotees ask for. The religious celebrations are carried out in strict tantric ways. There are also various cultural programs and other art forms arranged in association with the festival.
Utsavabali is conducted in the temple in a majestic manner on the 6th day. There is a special ritual called Sreebhootabali which is the puja feast provided for the Bhootaganas who are the soldiers of Shiva. All devotees assembled are served food.
On the 7th day of the festival, the idol is brought out from the temple, accompanied by seven eminent caparisoned elephants. To add to the beauty of the procession through the Manjapra town, Panchavadyam and Chendamelam are conducted by well known artists. The procession ends at the temple when the idol is taken inside the temple.

Shiva temples in Kerala
Hindu temples in Ernakulam district